Aimer la vie is a French-language studio album by Julio Iglesias, released in 1978 on CBS.

Track listing

Certifications

References 

1978 albums
Julio Iglesias albums
Columbia Records albums